Shahbajpur is a union parishad under Shibganj Upazila, Chapai Nawabganj District in the Rajshahi Division of north-western Bangladesh.

Geography
It has 20,871 households and a total area 38.1 km2.

Demographics
According to the 2011 Bangladesh census, Shahbajpur Union had a population of 48,518. This comprised 20,227 males and 28,291 females, with males constituting 46.65% of the population, and females 53.35%. Nabinagar has an average literacy rate of 43.60%, comprising 42.80% among males and 44.30% among females.

See also
Upazilas of Bangladesh
Districts of Bangladesh
Divisions of Bangladesh

References

External links
 Information of Rajshahi

Rajshahi Division
Populated places in Rajshahi Division